William Alvin Howard (born 1926) is a proof theorist best known for his work demonstrating formal similarity between intuitionistic logic and the simply typed lambda calculus that has come to be known as the Curry–Howard correspondence.  He has also been active in the theory of proof-theoretic ordinals.  He earned his Ph.D. at the University of Chicago in 1956 for his dissertation "k-fold recursion and well-ordering". He was a student of Saunders Mac Lane.

The Howard ordinal (also known as the Bachmann–Howard ordinal) was named after him.

He was elected to the 2018 class of fellows of the American Mathematical Society.

References

External links
Entry for William Alvin Howard at the Mathematics Genealogy Project.

20th-century American mathematicians
21st-century American mathematicians
American logicians
University of Chicago alumni
1926 births
Living people
Proof theorists
Fellows of the American Mathematical Society